The Galaxiidae  are a family of mostly small freshwater fish in the Southern Hemisphere. The majority live in Southern Australia or New Zealand, but some are found in South Africa, southern South America, Lord Howe Island, New Caledonia, and the Falkland Islands. One galaxiid species, the common galaxias (Galaxias maculatus), is probably the most widely naturally distributed freshwater fish in the Southern Hemisphere.  They are coolwater species, found in temperate latitudes, with only one species known from subtropical habitats. Many specialise in living in cold, high-altitude upland rivers, streams, and lakes.

Some galaxiids live in fresh water all their lives, but many have a partially marine lifecycle. In these cases, larvae are hatched in a river, but are washed downstream to the ocean, later returning to rivers as juveniles to complete their development to full adulthood. This pattern differs from that of salmon, which only return to fresh water to breed, and is described as amphidromous.

Freshwater galaxiid species are gravely threatened by exotic salmonid species, particularly  trout species, which prey upon galaxiids and compete with them for food.  Exotic salmonids have been recklessly introduced to many different land masses (e.g. Australia, New Zealand), with no thought as to impacts on native fish, or attempts to preserve salmonid-free habitats for them.  Numerous localised extinctions of galaxiid species have been caused by the introduction of exotic salmonids, and a number of freshwater galaxiid species are threatened with overall extinction by exotic salmonids.

Taxonomic diversity
About 50 species are in the family Galaxiidae, grouped into seven genera:

Genera
 Subfamily Aplochitoninae Begle 1991
 Genus Aplochiton Jenyns 1842 [Haplochiton Agassiz 1846; Farionella Valenciennes 1850 ex Cuvier & Valenciennes 1850] (two species)
 Genus Lovettia McCulloch 1915 (one species)
 Subfamily Galaxiinae [Paragalaxiinae Scott 1936]
 Genus Brachygalaxias Eigenmann 1928 (two species)
 Genus Galaxias Cuvier 1816 [Saxilaga Scott 1936; Galaxias (Agalaxis) Scott 1936; Agalaxis (Scott 1936); Lyragalaxias Whitley 1935; Austrocobitis Ogilby 1899; Mesites Jenyns 1842 non Schoenherr 1838 non Geoffroy 1838; Nesogalaxias Whitley 1935] (34 species)
 Genus Galaxiella McDowall 1978 (four species)
 Genus Neochanna Günther 1867 [Saxilaga (Lixagasa) Scott 1936; Lixagasa (Scott 1936); Saxilaga Scott 1936] (six species)
 Genus Paragalaxias Scott 1935 [Querigalaxias Whitley 1935] (four species)

Species by geography

Australia
Galaxiids are found around the south eastern seaboard of Australia and in some parts of south western Australia. The galaxiids and the temperate perches (Percichthyidae) are the dominant native freshwater fish families of southern Australia. Species common to all areas include:
 Common galaxias or jollytail galaxias, Galaxias maculatus 
 Spotted galaxias, spotted mountain trout, or spotted minnow, Galaxias truttaceus

South east Australian mainland
 Climbing galaxias, Galaxias brevipinnis 
 Mountain galaxias, Galaxias olidus 
 Flathead galaxias, Galaxias rostratus

Threatened species are:
 Galaxias fuscus (Victoria), also called barred galaxias or brown galaxias
 Dwarf galaxias, Galaxiella pusilla (South Australia, Victoria)
 Tasmanian mudfish, Neochanna cleaveri (Wilsons Promontory, Victoria)

Western Australia
 Western galaxias, Galaxias occidentalis 
 Mud minnow, Galaxiella munda 
 Black-stripe minnow, Galaxiella nigrostriata

Tasmania
Fifteen species of galaxiids have been found in Tasmania. The most common species are:
 Climbing galaxias, Galaxias brevipinnis 
 Common galaxias, Galaxias maculatus
 Spotted galaxias, Galaxias truttaceus

Tasmanian endangered species include:
 Saddled galaxias, Galaxias tanycephalus 
 Pedder galaxias, Galaxias pedderensis 
 Swan galaxias, Galaxias fontanus 
 Swamp galaxias, Galaxias parvus 
 Golden galaxias, Galaxias auratus 
 Dwarf galaxias, Galaxiella pusilla 
 Clarence galaxias, Galaxias johnstoni 
 Tasmanian mudfish, Neochanna cleaveri 
 Western paragalaxias, Paragalaxias julianus 
 Great Lake paragalaxias, Paragalaxias eleotroides 
 Arthurs paragalaxias, Paragalaxias mesotes 
 Shannon paragalaxias, Paragalaxias dissimilis

New Zealand 
Twenty-three species of galaxiids have been discovered in New Zealand, and prior to the introduction of non-native species such as trout, they were the dominant freshwater fish family. Most of these live in fresh water all their lives. However, the larvae of five species of the genus Galaxias develop in the ocean, where they form part of the zooplankton and return to rivers and streams as juveniles (whitebait), where they develop and remain as adults. All Galaxias species found in New Zealand are endemic, except for Galaxias brevipinnis (koaro) and Galaxias maculatus (inanga).

 Roundhead galaxias, Galaxias anomalus 
 Giant kokopu, Galaxias argenteus 
 Climbing galaxias, koaro, or short-fin galaxias, Galaxias brevipinnis 
 Lowland longjawed galaxias, Galaxias cobitinis 
 Flathead galaxias, Galaxias depressiceps
 Dwarf galaxias, Galaxias divergens 
 Eldon's galaxias, Galaxias eldoni
 Banded kokopu, Galaxias fasciatus 
 Gollum galaxias, Galaxias gollumoides 
 Dwarf inanga, Galaxias gracilis
 Bignose galaxias, Galaxias macronasus 
 Common galaxias, inanga, or common jollytail, Galaxias maculatus 
 Alpine galaxias, Galaxias paucispondylus 
 Shortjaw kokopu, Galaxias postvectis 
 Longjawed galaxias, Galaxias prognathus 
 Dusky galaxias, Galaxias pullus 
 Common river galaxias or Canterbury galaxias, Galaxias vulgaris 
 Brown mudfish, Neochanna apoda 
 Canterbury mudfish, Neochanna burrowsius 
 Black mudfish, Neochanna diversus 
 Northland mudfish, Neochanna heleios
 Chatham mudfish, Neochanna rekohua

South America
 Aplochiton taeniatus (Chile, Argentina, Falklands Islands)
 Common galaxias or puyen, Galaxias maculatus (Chile, Argentina, Falkland Islands)
 Brachygalaxias bullocki (Chile)
 Brachygalaxias gothei (Chile)
 Galaxias globiceps (Chile)
 Galaxias platei (Chile)

South Africa 
 Cape galaxias, Galaxias zebratus (Cape Province, South Africa)

Fishing 
The juveniles of those galaxiids that develop in the ocean and then move into rivers for their adult lives are caught as whitebait while moving upstream and are much valued as a delicacy. Adult galaxiids may be caught for food, but they are generally not large.  In some cases, their exploitation may be banned (e.g. New Zealand) unless available to indigenous tribes.

In addition to serious impacts from exotic trout species, Australian adult galaxiids suffer a disregard from anglers for being "too small" and "not being trout".  This is despite the fact that several Australian galaxiid species, though smallish, grow to a sufficient size to be catchable and readily take wet and dry flies, and that one of these species — the spotted galaxias — was keenly fished for in Australia before the introduction of exotic trout species.  A handful of fly-fishing exponents in Australia are rediscovering the pleasure of catching (and releasing) these Australian native fish on ultralight fly-fishing tackle.

References

External links 

 New Zealand native freshwater galaxiid fish TerraNature, Auckland 2010

 
Ray-finned fish families